The 1975 Australian Drivers' Championship was a CAMS sanctioned Australian motor racing title open to Australian Formula 1 cars and Australian Formula 2 cars. The championship winner was awarded the 1975 CAMS "Gold Star". The title, which was the nineteenth Australian Drivers' Championship, was won by John McCormack driving an Elfin MR6 Repco-Holden.

Calendar
The championship was contested over a five-round series.

Points system
Championship points were awarded on a 9, 6, 4, 3, 2, 1 basis to the first six placegetters at each round. Only holders of a current and valid full General Competition License issued by CAMS were eligible.

Championship results

Note: New Zealander Graeme Lawrence placed fourth in the Surfers Paradise round but was not eligible to score championship points.

Championship name
Contemporary publications used various names for the championship including Australian Formula 1 Championship, Australian Drivers' Championship and Australian National Formula One Championship. CAMS uses the term Australian Drivers' Championship in its historical documentation and this term has been used in this article.

References

Further reading
 Jim Shepherd, A History Of Australian Motor Sport, 1980
 The official 50-year history of the Australian Grand Prix, 1986

Australian Drivers' Championship
Drivers' Championship
Australian Formula 1
Formula 5000